Kalateh-ye Sahebdad (also Romanized as Kalāteh-ye Şāḩebdād; also known as Şāḩebdād) is a village in Pol Khatun Rural District, Marzdaran District, Sarakhs County, Razavi Khorasan Province, Iran. At the 2006 census, its population was 501, in 91 families.

References 

Populated places in Sarakhs County